Sergey Kostarev (born 25 March 1966) is a Soviet fencer. He won a bronze medal in the team épée event at the 1992 Summer Olympics.

References

External links
 

1966 births
Living people
Russian male fencers
Soviet male fencers
Olympic fencers of the Unified Team
Fencers at the 1992 Summer Olympics
Olympic bronze medalists for the Unified Team
Olympic medalists in fencing
Medalists at the 1992 Summer Olympics